The 2023 Pacific Island Cricket Challenge consisted of a men's Twenty20 International (T20I) and a women's Twenty20 International (WT20I) cricket tournament, that took place in Suva, Fiji, in March 2023.

Both events featured men's and women's national teams from Fiji, Papua New Guinea, Samoa and Vanuatu, as well as team representing the Australia and New Zealand Army Corps (ANZAC), with all games 
played at Albert Park in Suva. Papua New Guinea entered an academy team in the men's tournament due to their senior side playing a Cricket World Cup League 2 series in Nepal. The event was sponsored by the Australian Defence Force and also saw representatives from other Pacific island nations such as the Cook Islands and New Caledonia take part in training sessions to help boost the standard of cricket across the region. The arrival of the Vanuatu teams was delayed by the impact of Cyclones Judy and Kevin on the country.

Papua New Guinea won both the men's and women's tournaments.

Men's tournament

Squads

Round-robin

Points table

 Qualified for the semi-finals

Fixtures

Semi-finals

Third-place play-off

Final

Women's tournament

Squads

Round-robin

Points table

 Qualified for the semi-finals

Fixtures

Semi-finals

Third-place play-off

Final

Notes

References

External links
 Series home at ESPNcricinfo (Men's tournament)
 Series home at ESPNcricinfo (Women's tournament)

2023 in women's cricket
Associate international cricket competitions in 2022–23
Pacific Island Cricket Challenge